Henry Palmer (July 30, 1827June 15, 1895) was an American physician and educator.  He served as a Union Army surgeon in the American Civil War, and later became Surgeon General of the state of Wisconsin.  He was also the 12th mayor of Janesville, Wisconsin, and was professor of surgery at the College of Physicians and Surgeons of Chicago.

Early life
Palmer was born in New Hartford, New York, in 1827. He graduated from Albany Medical College in 1854. Shortly after graduating, Palmer traveled to Europe for vacation and ended up volunteering as a surgeon in the Crimean War.  In 1856, Palmer moved to Janesville, Wisconsin.

Military career
Palmer joined the 7th Wisconsin Volunteer Infantry Regiment in 1861. The following year, he was named Brigadier Surgeon of U.S. Volunteers and remained in the position until the conclusion of the Civil War. Additionally, he was chief surgeon at York U.S. Army Hospital.

Post-war
Palmer would spend time as a member of the faculty at the University of Illinois College of Medicine. From 1880 to 1890, he was Surgeon General of Wisconsin. Palmer was twice Mayor of Janesville. He died in 1895.

References

People from New Hartford, New York
People from Janesville, Wisconsin
People of Wisconsin in the American Civil War
Union Army generals
Physicians from Wisconsin
Mayors of places in Wisconsin
University of Illinois Chicago faculty
Albany Medical College alumni
1827 births
1895 deaths
19th-century American politicians